Jack Williams may refer to:

Politics
 Jack Williams (American politician) (1909–1998), American politician and Governor of Arizona
 Jack D. Williams, American politician in Birmingham, Alabama
 Jack W. Williams (politician), American politician in Wilmer, Alabama
 Jack Williams (New Zealand politician) (1919–1975), New Zealand politician of the Labour Party
 Jack Williams (socialist activist) (1854–1917), British socialist and unemployed movement activist

Sports

Association football (soccer)
 Jack Williams (footballer, born 1885), English footballer
 Jack Williams (footballer, born 1906) (1906–1982), English association footballer for Wolverhampton Wanderers, Gillingham, Brighton & Hove Albion
 Jack Williams (footballer, born 1997), English association footballer for Queens Park Rangers

Australian rules football
 Jack Williams (footballer, born 1902) (1902–1976), Australian rules footballer for Geelong
 Jack Williams (footballer, born 1907) (1907–1987), Australian rules footballer for Fitzroy
 Jack "Basher" Williams (1917–2000), Australian rules footballer for South Melbourne

Other sports
 Jack Williams (rugby union) (1882–1911), Wales and British Lions rugby union player
 Jack Williams (American football) (born 1985), American football player
 Jack Williams (rugby league) (born 1996), Australian rugby league player
 Jack Williams (archer) (born 2000), American archer

Other
 Jack Williams (VC) (1886–1953), Welsh recipient of the Victoria Cross
 Jack Williams (Medal of Honor) (1924–1945), American sailor
 Jack Kenny Williams (1920–1981), American teacher and university administrator
 Jack Eric Williams (1944–1994), American actor, composer and lyricist
 Jack Williams (news anchor) (born 1944), Boston TV personality
 Jack Williams (stuntman) (1921–2007), American motion picture stuntman
 Jack Williams (outlaws), two Old West outlaws of the same name
 Jack Williams, alias of Frances Clayton, American woman who disguised as a man to fight in the American Civil War
 Jack Williams, alias of Elizabeth Williams Berry, Australian-born American woman who disguised as a man to compete as a jockey in horse racing

See also
 John Williams (disambiguation)
 Jackie Williams (disambiguation)